Oleg Borisovich Akkuratov is a Russian pianist, jazz improviser and singer who has amaurosis – complete blindness. He is a virtuoso performer of jazz and classical works and a laureate of the Prize of the President of the Russian Federation for young cultural workers (2019).

Biography 
Akkuratov was born on October 21, 1989, in the city of Yeisk, Krasnodar Territory. Blind from birth, at the age of four, the boy began to show extraordinary musical abilities, playing the melodies he heard on the piano. The teachers of the Yeisk School of Music immediately took the boy to the 1st grade. And two years later he entered a specialized music school for blind and visually impaired children in the city of Armavir, Krasnodar Territory. Later, in parallel with his studies at school, Oleg studied at the Moscow State College of Music of Variety and Jazz Art, in the class of teacher Mikhail Okun. Akkuratov entered the pop and jazz department of the Institute of Music of the Moscow University of Culture and Art after graduating from the College of Music in 2008. In 2015, Akkuratov graduated with honors from the Rostov State Conservatory in 2017 – Postgraduate studies in chamber music. During his studies, Akkuratov took part in concerts and became a laureate of various music competitions, including international ones.
Previously, he lived in the village of Morevka near Yeisk. He worked as a soloist of the Russian Opera Theater, artistic director and soloist of the Eisk Jazz Orchestra MICH-Band (piano).

Akkuratov took part in a concert with the opera singer Montserrat Caballe, performed with Evelyn Glennie.
He took part in the world premiere of the international charitable action "Thousands of Cities of the World", performed at the residence of the Pope as the UNESCO World Consolidated Choir.

Oleg Akkuratov plays jazz and classical pieces. He sings in many languages: English, German, French, Spanish, Portuguese, Japanese, Chinese, Korean and others.
Lyudmila Gurchenko dedicated her debut directorial work to Akkuratov – the film "Colorful Twilight" shot in 2009.

November 24, 2009, was the hero of Andrey Malakhov program "Let them talk".

In 2013, Oleg Akkuratov began to work closely with People's Artist of Russia Igor Butman. As a member of the Igor Butman Quartet and the Moscow Jazz Orchestra, Akkuratov toured Latvia, Israel, the Netherlands, Italy, India, the US and Canada and many other countries.

In 2013, Oleg Akkuratov performed at the Igor Butman festival "Triumph of Jazz". In May of the same year, Akkuratov, along with double bass player Keith Davis, drummer Mark Whitfield and saxophonist Francesco Kafiso, took part in Igor Butman's international project "The Future of Jazz" and the projects "Chereshnevy Les" in Moscow, "Aquajazz. Sochi Jazz Festival" in Sochi.

In March 2014, his performance completed the closing ceremony of the XI Paralympic Games in Sochi.

In April 2015, at the invitation of Winton Marsalis, Akkuratov performed at the Rose Hall of New York's Lincoln Center with the Jazz at Lincoln Center Orchestra.
On February 1, 2017, in the Svetlanov Hall of the Moscow International House of Music, Akkuratov's first big solo concert with Igor Butman's participation took place. In October of the same year, Akkuratov, as part of his own trio, performed for several thousand guests of the 19th World Festival of Youth and Students in Sochi.

In 2018, Oleg Akkuratov took part in the Gala Concert of the International Day of Jazz organized by UNESCO, was awarded the Moscow Mayor's Prize, and also took second place at the prestigious Sarah Vaughan International Jazz Vocal Competition, held in the homeland of jazz, in the USA.

Education 
 1996–2009 Armavir State Music School for Blind and Visually Impaired Children. Teacher: Anna Kudryashova
 2005–2008 State College of Music of Variety and Jazz Art. Teacher: Mikhail Okun
 2009–2011 Moscow University of Culture and Art, Institute of Music. Teacher: Mikhail Okun
 2011–2015 Rostov State Conservatory named after S.V. Rachmaninov. Teacher: Vladimir Dyche
 2015–2017 Rostov State Conservatory. S.V. Rachmaninov, Postgraduate studies. Teacher: Margarita Chernykh

Competitions and awards

Films about him 
 The documentaryː «Boy from Armavir. Extraordinary wunderkind », 2007.
 Feature Filmː «Сolorful twilight», 2009.
 The documentaryː «Wunderkind», 2014.

References 

 Oleg Akkuratov and Moscow Jazz Orchestra. An outstanding young Russian jazz piano/vocals prodigy
 Oleg Akkuratov. Mariinsky Theatre
 interview with Oleg Akkuratov
 Vocal jazz prodigy and pianist Oleg Akkuratov
 Letter from Saint-Petersburg
 NJPAC Announces 2018 Sarah Vaughan Competition Finalists
 Laurin Talese Wins Sarah Vaughan Vocal Competition

Russian jazz pianists
Russian blind people
Blind musicians
Russian jazz singers
1989 births
Living people
People from Krasnodar
Russian classical pianists
20th-century Russian singers
21st-century Russian singers
20th-century Russian male singers
21st-century Russian male singers